Jorge Jiménez Cantú (1914–2005) was a Mexican physician and politician who served as Secretary of Health and Welfare and  Governor of the State of Mexico between 1975 and 1981.

Early life 
In 1931, he joined the National Preparatory School, where he attended high school in biological sciences and served as faculty advisor. He then decided to enter the Faculty of Medicine of the National Autonomous University of Mexico in 1934.

1914 births
2005 deaths
Governors of the State of Mexico
Mexican Secretaries of Health
20th-century Mexican physicians
Physicians from Mexico City